Rachel Eva Goslins (born July 23, 1969) is an American arts administrator and documentary film director and producer. In August 2016, she was appointed director of the Smithsonian's Arts and Industries Building. She was previously head of the President’s Committee on the Arts and the Humanities.

Career

Goslins was executive director of the President's Committee on the Arts and Humanities, an advisory committee to the White House on cultural policy. President Obama appointed her to this position in 2009. In this capacity, she works closely with the White House, senior government officials, prominent artists, philanthropists and entrepreneurs and the country’s leading cultural institutions to advance and support the arts and humanities in America and abroad. Under her management, the organization more than doubled its budget and programmatic activities, raised over $10M in public-private partnerships to support the arts, and launched several major new initiatives, including a partnership with the US Department of Education and the Ford Foundation to bring arts education to a group of the country’s lowest-performing elementary schools, and a program with the Smithsonian Institution, UNESCO and the U.S. Department of State to rescue and preserve Haitian cultural artifacts in the wake of the 2009 hurricane. She stepped down as executive director in 2015.

Film
Her feature documentary, Bama Girl premiered at the 2008 South by Southwest (SXSW) Film Festival and later broadcast on the Independent Film Channel (IFC). It is the story of a "black woman at the University of Alabama who runs for 2005 Homecoming Queen, going up against a century of ingrained racial segregation, internal black politics, and The Machine, a secret coalition of traditionally white fraternities and sororities formed in 1914. She has worked on productions for the Public Broadcasting Service (PBS), the Discovery Channel, the National Geographic Channel (Nat Geo), and History, and was the director of the Independent Digital Distribution Lab, a joint PBS/ITVS project. Her most recent film was Besa: The Promise, an award-winning feature documentary about Albanian Muslims who saved Jews during World War II.

Law
Prior to her arts career, Rachel was an international copyright attorney in the office of Policy and International Affairs in the U.S. Copyright Office, where she had responsibility for negotiating and drafting sections of the Digital Millennium Copyright Act of 1998 and represented  the Copyright Office at UNESCO, the World Intellectual Property Organization and the World Trade Organization. She began her career as a litigator for the law firm of Gibson Dunn & Crutcher. In 2012 she was awarded a Henry Crown Fellowship at the Aspen Institute.

Personal life

She was previously married to investor and former Federal Communications Commission Chairman Julius Genachowski, and they have two children together.

References

External links
Webcast on World Digital Library

American film directors
Living people
1969 births
American women film directors
University of California, Santa Cruz alumni
UCLA School of Law alumni
New York University alumni
Obama administration personnel
Henry Crown Fellows
People associated with Gibson Dunn
21st-century American women